X Factor is a Danish television music competition to find new singing talent. The Third season premiered on January 1, 2010 and ended on March 27 on DR1.   Lise Rønne returned as host. Thomas Blachman returned for his third series as judge Pernille Rosendahl for her second series and Cutfather joined for the first time as judge.

Judges and hosts

Selection process

Auditions
Auditions took place in Copenhagen and Århus in 2010.

Superbootcamp
Cutfather was given the 15-24s category, Thomas Blachman was given the Over 25s and Pernille Rosendahl was given the Groups.

Bootcamp

The 6 eliminated acts were:
15-24s: Ericka, Jean
Over 25s: Maria, Mia
Groups: Michelle & Liva, Troels & Lasse

Contestants

Key:
 – Winner
 – Runner-up

Live shows

Results summary

Colour key

Contestants' colour key:
{|
|-
| – Cutfather's contestants (15-24s)
|-
| – Blachman's contestants (Over 25s)
|-
| – Rosendahl's contestants (Groups)

|}

Live show details

Week 1 (February 11)
Theme: Free Choice
Musical Guest: Thomas Ring ("Break the Silence")

Judges' votes to eliminate
 Rosendahl: Ercan
 Blachman: Deevibez
 Cutfather: Deevibez

Week 2 (February 18)
Theme: The Beatles songs
Musical Guest: Basim ("Ta' mig tilbage")

Judges' votes to eliminate
 Rosendahl: Ercan
 Cutfather: Patricia
 Blachman: Ercan

Week 3 (February 25)
Theme: Danish Hits from the 2000s
Musical Guest: Nik & Jay ("Mod solnedgangen") 
Group Performance: "En dag tilbage" performed by Nik & Jay and the final 7

Judges' votes to eliminate
 Blachman: JR
 Cutfather: Rikke & Trine
 Rosendahl: JR

Week 4 (March 4)
Theme: Rock
Musical Guest: Heidi Herløw ("Angerholic")

Judges' votes to eliminate
 Cufather: Annelouise
 Blachman: Rasmus
 Rosendahl: Rasmus

Week 5 (March 11)
Theme: Free Choice accompanied by DR UnderholdningsOrkestret
Group Performance:  "Fuck You" 

Judges' votes to eliminate
 Rosendahl: Annelouise
 Blachman: Rikke & Trine
 Cutfather: Rikke & Trine

Week 6: Semi-Final (March 18)
Theme: DJ Night (with Rune RK & Kato) & Viewers choice
Musical Guests: Clara Sofie & Rune RK ("Lever for en anden"), Infernal & Kato ("Speakers On")

Week 7: Final (25 March) 
 Theme: Free Choice; Duet with Musical Guests; winner's single

Season 04
2011 Danish television seasons